The 1950–51 Serie A season was won by Milan.

Teams
Napoli and Udinese had been promoted from Serie B.

Final classification

Results

Top goalscorers

References and sources

Almanacco Illustrato del Calcio - La Storia 1898-2004, Panini Edizioni, Modena, September 2005

External links
 :it:Classifica calcio Serie A italiana 1951 - Italian version with pictures and info.
  - All results on RSSSF Website.

Serie A seasons
Italy
1950–51 in Italian football leagues